Echo (minor planet designation: 60 Echo) is a quite large main-belt asteroid. It was discovered by James Ferguson of the United States Naval Observatory in Washington D.C., on September 14, 1860. It was his third and final asteroid discovery. It is named after Echo, a nymph in Greek mythology.  James Ferguson had initially named it "Titania", not realizing that name was already used for a satellite of Uranus.

Its orbital plane is at an inclination of 3.6° to the plane of the ecliptic. This is a stony S-type asteroid with a cross-sectional size of 60.2 km that is spinning with a rotation period of 25.2 hr. Echo has been studied by radar. It is not known to be a member of any asteroid family.

References

External links 
 
 

Background asteroids
Echo
Echo
S-type asteroids (Tholen)
S-type asteroids (SMASS)
18600914